The 1964 United States presidential election in Vermont took place on November 3, 1964, as part of the 1964 United States presidential election in which all 50 states plus the District of Columbia participated. Vermont voters chose 3 electors to represent them in the Electoral College via a popular vote pitting incumbent Democratic President Lyndon B. Johnson and his running mate, Senate Majority Whip Hubert Humphrey, against Republican challenger and Senator Barry Goldwater from Arizona and his running mate and Chair of the Republican National Committee, William E. Miller. It was the first time in Vermont's history that the state voted for the Democratic Party.

Vermont voted overwhelmingly for Lyndon B. Johnson with 66.30% of the vote to Goldwater's 33.69%, a Democratic victory margin of 32.61%. With this decisive win, Johnson became the first Democratic presidential candidate to ever win Vermont, breaking a Republican voting streak of 104 years, beginning in 1856. It is also the only time that a Republican won fewer than 100 electoral votes with none of them coming from Vermont. Johnson's landslide margin of victory in this traditional Republican stronghold even made the state ten percentage points more Democratic than the national average in the 1964 election. Along with winning the state for the first time, Johnson was also the first Democratic presidential candidate to carry Addison, Bennington, Caledonia, Rutland, Orange, Orleans, Windham and Windsor Counties. Had Goldwater won the state, Vermont would have remained for the longest streak for every consecutive Republican until 1992.

Vermont historically was a bastion of progressive Northeastern Republicanism, and by 1964 the Green Mountain State had gone Republican in every presidential election since the founding of the Republican Party. However, in 1964 this streak came to an end when the GOP nominated staunch conservative Barry Goldwater, who was widely seen in the liberal Northeastern United States as a right-wing extremist; he had voted against the Civil Rights Act of 1964, and the Johnson campaign portrayed him as a warmonger who as president would provoke a nuclear war. Thus, Goldwater performed especially weakly in liberal northeastern states like Vermont, and for the first time in history, a Democratic presidential candidate swept every Northeastern state in 1964. Not only did Johnson win every Northeastern state, but he won all of them with landslides of over 60% of the vote, including Vermont, which weighed in as the ninth most Democratic state in the nation.  Goldwater lost the 1964 election in a nationwide landslide, but the loss in Vermont was especially severe from a historical perspective. 

Johnson swept all 14 counties in Vermont, breaking 60% of the vote in 11 of them. In the northwestern part of the state, Johnson broke 70% of the vote in 2 counties: Chittenden County, the most populous county, home to the state's largest city, Burlington, as well as Franklin County. The northwestern three counties of Vermont had long been Democratic enclaves in an otherwise Republican state, and remained the most Democratic region in 1964, even as the rest of the state finally joined them in voting Democratic. Johnson's weakest performance was in Lamoille County, where he carried 53.85% of the vote to Goldwater's 46.15% – a strong performance for the Democrats nonetheless.

After 1964, the state would revert to voting GOP again in 1968 and remain in the Republican column for another twenty-year streak through 1988, although the Republicans would never recover the overwhelming margins by which they once dominated Vermont. The results of 1964, with Goldwater dominating the Deep South while losing the Northeast, would foreshadow the future political trajectory of the nation. Like the rest of the Northeast, Vermont would finally flip to the Democrats for good in 1992, ultimately forming what would be known as the Blue Wall. As the GOP became increasingly dominated by Southerners, conservatives, and evangelicals, the 1964 election would foreshadow Vermont's modern-day status as one of the most Democratic and left-wing states in the nation.

Johnson's landslide win in Vermont would remain the strongest Democratic victory in the state until the elections of Barack Obama, who outperformed Johnson in Vermont in both 2008 and 2012. In 2020, Joe Biden outperformed Johnson's margin but not his vote share (though due to that election being significantly closer, Vermont was still the most Democratic state in the union), This marked the end of the longest presidential voting streak of any party in any state.  

Vermont was one of the three states that voted with a certain party for the first time in this election, the other two being Alaska and Georgia.

Results

Results by county

Counties that flipped from Republican to Democratic

 Addison (largest town: Middlebury)
 Bennington (largest town: Bennington)
 Caledonia (largest town: St. Johnsbury)
 Essex (largest town: Lunenburg)
 Lamoille (largest town: Morristown)
 Orange (largest town: Randolph)
 Orleans (largest city: Newport)
 Rutland (largest city: Rutland)
 Washington (largest city: Barre)
 Windham (largest town: Brattleboro)
 Windsor (largest town: Hartford)

See also
 United States presidential elections in Vermont

References

Vermont
1964
1964 Vermont elections